Loup Loup Ski Bowl is a ski area located in the Methow Valley of Okanogan County, Washington, midway between the towns of Twisp and Omak on Highway 20.

The ski area's season generally runs from late November or December until April, but is only open four days out of the week, and on holidays. Loup Loup offers ski and snowboard lessons, rentals, and also children's programs.

Loup Loup has been recognized as a safe ski area with short lift lines, polite skiers, and reasonably priced food by ''Seattle Post-Intelligencer.

Alpine Skiing
Loup Loup features a vertical rise of 1220 feet (370 m) to a top elevation of 5280 feet (1610 m) above sea level. Loup has 550 acres (2.2 km²) of alpine skiing area. The hill has 10 major runs, and 3 lifts, including a quad chair that was moved to Loup Loup from Crystal Mountain. The mountain is operated by a non-profit ski education foundation with a board of fifteen volunteers.

Cross-Country Skiing
From the base area, 23 km of cross country trails are accessible, with another 50 km of trails maintained by Washington State Parks nearby.

Other Activities
In 2022 the Loup began offering summer activities, including an 18 hole alpine disc golf course, mountain and gravel bike rentals, and summer camping. 
During the winter they also offer a tubing hill and luge run.

References

External links
SkiTown.com - Loup Loup Ski Bowl Info and Stats
GoSki Reviews of Loup Loup
Official Loup Loup Website

Ski areas and resorts in Washington (state)
Tourist attractions in Okanogan County, Washington